Hans Peter Waldmann (24 September 1922 – 18 March 1945) was a German Luftwaffe (Air Force) fighter ace and recipient of the Knight's Cross of the Iron Cross of Nazi Germany. Waldmann received the award after he had shot down 85 enemy aircraft. In total, he was credited with 134 aerial victories accumulated in 527 combat missions.

Born in Braunschweig, Waldmann volunteered for service in the Luftwaffe in 1940. After training at various pilot and fighter-pilot schools, he was posted to Jagdgeschwader 52 (JG 52—52nd Fighter Wing), operating on the Eastern Front, in August 1942. Here Waldmann fought in the aerial battles over Stalingrad, the Caucasus, the Black Sea, and the Crimea. He was credited with 84 aerial victories before briefly being transferred to the Western Front, where he was credited with one aerial victory. Back on the Eastern Front, Waldmann accumulated further victories, bringing his score to 125 victories by end of May 1944. He then fought in the skies over France after the Western Allied Invasion of Normandy, claiming seven aerial victories, before converting to the Messerschmitt Me 262 jet fighter in late 1944. Flying the Me 262, Waldmann shot down two North American P-51 Mustangs on 22 February 1945 before being killed in a mid-air collision with one of his squadron members on 18 March 1945 near Schwarzenbek, Holstein.

Childhood, education and early career
Waldmann was born in Braunschweig in the Free State of Brunswick on 24 September 1922. He was the second son of Ludwig Waldmann, a bank manager, and his wife Maria. Waldmann had an older brother Paul. In 1928 he attended the Volksschule, a primary school, in the Comenius-Street. Over Easter in 1932 he transferred to the humanities-oriented secondary school Wilhelm-Gymnasium.

In 1938, Waldmann applied for a career as an officer in the Luftwaffe for the first time. Travelling to Berlin, he was deemed suitable but at the age of 16 was too young to volunteer for military service. After the outbreak of World War II, while still at school, Waldmann and his fellow students were forced into compulsory labour service (Reichsarbeitsdienst). Waldmann was assigned to the Brunswick Mechanical Engineering Institute. Since Waldmann had intended to study aircraft construction after his military service, he was reassigned to the Institute of Aeronautical Metrology and Flight Meteorology at the Braunschweig-Waggum airfield under the leadership of Prof. Dr. Heinrich Koppe.

At the end of March 1940, Waldmann graduated from school with his Abitur (diploma). After this he was accepted into the Luftwaffe, two years after his initial application. Commencing in July 1940, he undertook 12 weeks of basic military training with Fliegerausbildungsregiment 72 (72nd Flight Training Regiment) at Fels am Wagram in Austria. Upon completion, Waldmann was transferred to the Flugzeugführerschule A/B 72 (flight school for the pilot license) at Markersdorf near Sankt Pölten in early October 1940. Eight days later his training group returned to Fels am Wagram because Markersdorf was overcrowded with other flight courses. Thus flight training started on the improvised airfield without hangars at Fels am Wagram. His first familiarisation flight was on 16 October 1940, in a Bücker Bü 131 "Jungmann" biplane marked "VTAF". Waldmann logged his first solo flight on 13 November 1940 at 09:17 in a Bü 131 "CGNL", landing again after six minutes of flight time. His training group returned to Markersdorf in February 1941. From here, he conducted his first cross-country flights on the Bü 131 "Jungmann" as well as the Focke-Wulf Fw 44 "Stieglitz". The majority of the cross-country flights were flown on the Gotha Go 145. From 4 April to 28 April 1941 he made the round trip from Markersdorf to Pocking, Nürnberg, Ettingshausen, Ingolstadt, Zwickau, Hildesheim, Braunschweig, Mannheim, Karlsruhe, Delmenhorst, Halberstadt and Fürth. At Ettingshausen he received instruction in formation flying and aerobatics.

By August 1941 Operation Barbarossa, the German invasion of the Soviet Union, had been underway for two months, and after completing his A/B flight training at Markersdorf Waldmann was transferred to the Jagdfliegerschule 6 (6th Fighter Pilot School) at Lachen-Speyerdorf near Neustadt an der Weinstraße. He completed the final phase of his fighter pilot training in Gleiwitz, Upper Silesia, from 3 June to 17 August 1942, before transferring to the front.

World War II

Holding the rank of Unteroffizier, a non-commissioned officer similar in rank to sergeant, on 20 August 1942 Waldmann was tasked with shuttling new Messerschmitt Bf 109Gs from a factory at Krakau to units on the Eastern Front. Along with six other newly trained pilots, he reached Lemberg where the group was scheduled for a stop over. Bad weather closed in and Waldmann was the only one to take off before the group was grounded. Getting away at 17:55, he headed for Proskuriv. For the next few days, he was sent back and forth until he finally reached the II. Gruppe (2nd group) of Jagdgeschwader 52 (JG 52—52nd Fighter Wing) at Tusow, operating in the combat area of Stalingrad.

On arrival, Waldmann was approached by Hauptmann (Captain) Johannes Steinhoff and asked whether he would like to fly as his wingman. Waldmann then conducted six familiarisation flights on the "Gustav", as the Bf 109 G-2 was referred to, on 30 August 1942. Flying a Bf 109 marked with a black "Chevron-2", indicating an aircraft of the Stab, he flew his first combat mission on 31 August 1942 in the vicinity of Stalingrad. Steinhoff was impressed by his first performance. At the time, Waldmann was still officially assigned to a transfer squadron, but Steinhoff decided to keep him in his Stabs-Schwarm, flight of four. Here his comrades nicknamed Waldmann "Dackel", an allusion to his last name. In German, a "Dackel", or Dachshund, is often named Waldi, a hypocoristic form of Waldmann.

War against the Soviet Union
In September 1942, II. Gruppe was ordered into the Battle of the Caucasus, supporting Army Group South on the front over the Caucasus. Opposing it was the 4th and 5th Air Armies of the Red Air Force. The Gruppe reached an airfield named Gonschtakowka located north-northeast of Mozdok on the Terek on 6 September. There, Waldmann claimed his first aerial victory over a Lavochkin-Gorbunov-Gudkov LaGG-3 fighter.

On 25 September, Waldmann's Bf 109 G-2 (Werknummer 13650—factory number) sustained minor damage in combat, resulting in a forced landing at Maikop. He made another forced landing on 7 May 1943, this time due to engine failure of his Bf 109 G-4 at Taman. After 84 victories on 1 September 1943, Waldmann was promoted to Leutnant (second lieutenant) and assigned to Ergänzungs-Jagdgruppe Ost (Supplementary Fighter Group East). Here he was credited with the destruction of a B-17 Flying Fortress on 5 January 1944. This victory, his 85th, was actually a separation-shot—a severely damaged heavy bomber forced to separate from his combat box—which counted as an aerial victory. Waldmann had attacked a 28-aircraft bomber formation and severely damaged the B-17. The aerial-victory commission of Luftflotte 3 also credited the Flak-Regiment 45 of 12. Flak-Brigade with this victory. Following this aerial victory, he received the Knight's Cross of the Iron Cross on 5 February 1944. The presentation of the award was announced by the Greater German Radio—the official radio station of the Ministry of Public Enlightenment and Propaganda—on the evening of 20 February 1944.

In late February 1944 Waldmann was sent back to the Crimean peninsula on the Eastern Front, where he took command of 4./JG 52 (4th Squadron of the 52nd Fighter Wing) as its Staffelkapitän (squadron leader). He succeeded Oberleutnant Heinrich Sturm who had been wounded by bomb debris in an attack on the airfield at Chersonesus at Sevastopol on 16 April. He continued his success, claiming eight aerial victories in March, and 16 in April of which eight were claimed from 5–12 April. On 11 April 1944, he claimed three aerial victories. He was the 70th Luftwaffe pilot to achieve the century mark. On 4 May 1944, 15 Bf 109s from II. Gruppe intercepted 24 Ilyushin Il-2 ground-attack aircraft from 8 GShAP (8th Guards Ground-attack Aviation Regiment) and 47 GShAP (47th Ground-attack Aviation Regiment), escorted by 23 fighter aircraft, over the Black Sea. In this encounter, pilots from II. Gruppe claimed six aerial victories, including an Il-2 and a Yakovlev Yak-7 by Waldmann, without sustaining any losses. However, Soviet records only document the loss of three Il-2 and one Yakovlev Yak-9 fighter.

Waldmann became an "ace-in-a-day" on 7 May 1944, claiming six aerial victories over the Sevastopol combat area. Two Staffeln (squadrons) of the II./JG 52 were transferred to Huși at the Prut River on 27 May 1944. Here Waldmann claimed his final four victories on the Eastern Front, taking his total to 125 aerial victories claimed. On 1 June, Gruppenkommandeur (group commander) Major Gerhard Barkhorn was ordered to transfer one Staffel to the west in Defence of the Reich. Barkhorn selected Waldmann's 4. Staffel which was officially assigned to the II./Jagdgeschwader 3 "Udet" (JG 3—3rd Fighter Wing). There, the Staffel was later renamed and became the 8. Staffel of JG 3. At the time, II./JG 3 was under the command of Hauptmann Hans-Ekkehard Bob, and later by Hauptmann Herbert Kutscha.

Invasion of Normandy
The Invasion of Normandy, which started on the early morning of 6 June 1944, was in full swing by the time Waldmann's Staffel arrived in France in early July. The Western Allies were already breaking out of Normandy in what was codenamed Operation Cobra. The Gruppe was tasked with ground support missions. In one of these missions against the Allied invasion forces, Waldmann claimed to have damaged a P-51 Mustang on 31 July 1944. He was credited with the destruction of numerous trucks during ground support missions over the period of 2–5 August 1944.

Waldmann's claimed his first aerial victory in the west, his 126th in total, over a B-24 Liberator on 6 August 1944. Waldmann had taken off at 11:43 on a free-fighter sweep mission against heavy bombers. His unit spotted a formation of B-24s after 45 minutes flying time. Waldmann attacked and with his first pass at an altitude of  had hit one of the B-24 between the two starboard engines, which immediately set the bomber on fire. His final tally for August was seven Allied planes, including the B-24, one Auster on 7 August, and five P-47 Thunderbolts (two on 14 August, two on 18 August and one on 19 August). This took his total to 132 aerial victory claims.

Flying the Messerschmitt Me 262 and death
On 25 November 1944, II. Gruppe was detached from JG 3. The Gruppe was converted to fly the Messerschmitt Me 262 "Stormbird" jet fighter and became the I. Gruppe of Jagdgeschwader 7 (JG 7—7th Fighter Wing), the first operational jet fighter wing. Conversion training was held at Landsberg am Lech and Kaltenkirchen in December 1944. The pilots first learned to fly the Siebel Si 204 and Messerschmitt Bf 110 to familiarize themselves with the characteristics of a twin-engine aircraft. In consequence, Waldmann was transferred to 3./JG 7, now flying the "Stormbird", as its Staffelführer (squadron leader on probation).

Together with his wingman‚ Oberfähnrich Günter Schrey, Waldmann took off at 11:39 on 22 February 1945 from Oranienburg on an offensive counter-air mission against inbound Allied heavy bombers. The Anglo-American attack was codenamed Operation Clarion. Closing fast, Waldmann shot down the Mustang at 12:02 before proceeding west for Magdeburg. Waldmann shot it down at 12:17, achieving his 134th and final aerial victory.

Major Erich Rudorffer, Gruppenkommandeur of the I./JG 7, was attending a meeting at the Luftgaukommando in Hamburg-Blankenese, when Oberleutnant Hans Grünberg, the most senior officer on duty and Staffelkapitän of the 1st Staffel, received the order from Major Richter, the Ia (operations officer), to engage inbound heavy bombers. Grünberg initially argued that weather conditions prohibited a safe takeoff but Reichsmarschall Hermann Göring intervened and ordered the jets to engage the enemy.

The order resulted in the death of both Waldmann and his wingman Schrey on the following mission. Waldmann was killed following a mid-air collision with Leutnant Hans-Dieter Weihs shortly after takeoff, and Schrey was killed in combat with US fighters. Mindful of the direct order of the Reichsmarschall, Oberleutnant Grünberg (1st Staffel), Oberleutnant Fritz Stehle (2nd Staffel) and Waldmann (3rd Staffel) had decided that each of them would lead a flight of four Me 262s, taking off and flying around for an hour before returning without trying to engage the enemy. Grünberg's Schwarm took off first followed by Stehle's Schwarm. Waldmann chose Weihs, as the most experienced pilot trained in instrument flight, to lead the Schwarm, while Schrey once again served as Waldmann's wingman. Waldmann's Me 262 A-1 "Yellow 3" (Werknummer 117097—factory number) took off at 12:24 and Weihs ordered the Schwarm to form a close formation, flying wing tip to wing tip.

Only three Me 262s took off; Flieger Gerhard Reiher's Me 262 had experienced engine failure. His jet in an unrecoverable spin, Weihs bailed out and came down near the Hamburg-Berlin railroad tracks. The airfield at Kaltenkirchen was immediately informed. Waldmann and Schrey were initially believed missing. Apparently he had managed to bail out but failed to deploy his parachute in time, although the injuries sustained during the crash with Weihs' aircraft may have already been fatal as the recovery party found Waldmann with his upper forehead smashed. Schrey was also found dead. He had bailed out with his parachute, but his body was found riddled by machine-gun bullets.

The airmen were buried with full military honours, including a Me 262 flypast, at the cemetery in Kaltenkirchen. Waldmann's successor as Staffelkapitän, Oberleutnant Walter Wagner, accompanied Waldmann's mother from Braunschweig to Kaltenkirchen for the funeral. A number of wreaths were laid on his grave, the largest sent by the Reichsmarschall. Waldmann was recommended for the Oak Leaves to the Knight's Cross, but the recommendation was either not approved or not finalized before the end of the war.

Summary of career

Aerial victory claims
According to US historian David T. Zabecki, Waldmann was credited with 134 aerial victories. Authors Bracke and Obermaier also list Waldmann with 134 aerial victories, claimed in 527 combat missions, 10 on the Western Front and 124 on the Eastern Front. His tally on the Eastern Front includes five bombers, 86 fighters and 33 Il-2 Sturmovik ground-attack aircraft. On the Western Front he claimed seven fighters, two four-engined bombers and one observation aircraft. He also flew a number of ground attack missions, destroying 33 various vehicles and eight heavy transports. Mathews and Foreman, authors of Luftwaffe Aces — Biographies and Victory Claims, researched the German Federal Archives and found records for 131 aerial victory claims, plus seven further unconfirmed claims. This figure of confirmed claims includes 121 aerial victories on the Eastern Front and 10 on the Western Front, including two four-engined bombers and two victories with the Me 262 jet fighter.

Victory claims were logged to a map-reference (PQ = Planquadrat), for example "PQ 28472". These sectors were then subdivided into 36 smaller units to give a location area 3 × 4 km in size.

Awards
 Iron Cross (1939)
 2nd Class (25 September 1942)
 1st Class (11 November 1942)
 Front Flying Clasp of the Luftwaffe for Fighter Pilots in Gold (1 February 1943)
 Honour Goblet of the Luftwaffe on 15 March 1943 as Unteroffizier and pilot
 German Cross in Gold on 17 April 1943 as Unteroffizier in the 6./Jagdgeschwader 52
 Knight's Cross of the Iron Cross on 5 February 1944 as Feldwebel and pilot in the 6./Jagdgeschwader 52

Waldmann may have been awarded a posthumous Knight's Cross of the Iron Cross with Oak Leaves. Oberst Nicolaus von Below processed such a request between 20 April 1945 and 2 May 1945, although no official proof exists.

Translation notes

Notes

References

Citations

Bibliography

 
 
 
 
 
 
 
 
 
 
 
 
 
 
 
 
 
 
 
 
 
 
 
 
 

1922 births
1945 deaths
Aviators killed in aviation accidents or incidents in Germany
Luftwaffe personnel killed in World War II
German World War II flying aces
Military personnel from Braunschweig
Recipients of the Gold German Cross
Recipients of the Knight's Cross of the Iron Cross
Victims of aviation accidents or incidents in 1945
Reich Labour Service members